The Red Sea Fleet Command or officially Western Fleet (WF), also called " West Coast Fleet ", is a regional naval fleet and one of the two main formations of the Saudi Arabian Navy, with headquarters at Royal Naval Base at Jeddah, Western Province, that is the HQ and home port of the west sea fleet command of the Kingdom of Saudi Arabia.

See also
 Eastern Fleet (Saudi Arabia)

References

External links
 

Fleet
Red Sea
Naval warfare
Naval fleets
 
 
Military units and formations established in 1800
Military units and formations of Saudi Arabia